The 1963 Virginia Cavaliers football team represented the University of Virginia during the 1963 NCAA University Division football season. The Cavaliers were led by third-year head coach Bill Elias and played their home games at Scott Stadium in Charlottesville, Virginia. They competed as members of the Atlantic Coast Conference, finishing in last.

Schedule

Source:

References

Virginia
Virginia Cavaliers football seasons
Virginia Cavaliers football